May long weekend may refer to:

Canada
 Victoria Day, the second to last Monday in May and its preceding Saturday and Sunday, a three-day weekend for most residents

United States
 Memorial Day, the last Monday in May and its preceding Saturday and Sunday, a three-day weekend for most residents